The J. H. Rountree Mansion is located in Platteville, Wisconsin.

History
John H. Rountree was one of the founders of Platteville. He was a veteran of the Black Hawk War who served in the Wisconsin State Senate and the Wisconsin State Assembly. The house remained in Rountree's family for several decades before one of his descendants left the house to the state. For a number of years, it was used as the residence for the Chancellor of what is now the University of Wisconsin-Platteville.

The house was listed on the National Register of Historic Places in 1986 and on the State Register of Historic Places in 1989. The Mitchell-Rountree House is also located in Platteville. Rountree built it for his father-in-law, Samuel Mitchell, an American Revolutionary War veteran who served as a Methodist Episcopal clergyman.

References

Houses on the National Register of Historic Places in Wisconsin
National Register of Historic Places in Grant County, Wisconsin
Houses in Grant County, Wisconsin
University of Wisconsin–Platteville
Neoclassical architecture in Wisconsin
Greek Revival architecture in Wisconsin
Brick buildings and structures
Houses completed in 1854